Mikel Loinaz Balda (born 28 March 1967) is a Spanish former professional footballer who played as a forward.

He appeared in 48 La Liga matches for Real Sociedad over six seasons, scoring 12 goals.

Club career
Born in Andoain, Gipuzkoa, Loinaz started playing amateur football in France before signing with Real Sociedad in 1986 and being assigned to their reserves. He made his La Liga debut on 16 November that year when he came on as a late substitute in a 2–0 home win against CA Osasuna, and scored his first goal on 11 September 1988 to close the 2–1 victory over Real Betis also at the Atotxa Stadium. Additionally, he netted four times in the 1988–89 edition of the UEFA Cup, helping his team reach the quarter-finals.

Loinaz took his game to Segunda División after leaving Real in the 1993 off-season, representing Villarreal CF and SD Eibar. After two years in Portugal with Leça FC (in both the Primeira and Segunda Liga) he returned to his country, seeing out his career at the age of 37 with Tercera División club Peña Deportiva Santa Eulàlia.

References

External links

1967 births
Living people
People from Andoain
Sportspeople from Gipuzkoa
Spanish footballers
Footballers from the Basque Country (autonomous community)
Association football forwards
La Liga players
Segunda División players
Segunda División B players
Tercera División players
Real Sociedad B footballers
Real Sociedad footballers
Villarreal CF players
SD Eibar footballers
CE Sabadell FC footballers
Ontinyent CF players
SCR Peña Deportiva players
Primeira Liga players
Liga Portugal 2 players
Leça F.C. players
Spanish expatriate footballers
Expatriate footballers in Portugal
Spanish expatriate sportspeople in Portugal